Gold Medal Books, launched by Fawcett Publications in 1950, was an American book publisher known for introducing paperback originals, a publishing innovation at the time. Fawcett was also an independent newsstand distributor, and in 1949 the company negotiated a contract with New American Library to distribute their Mentor and Signet titles. This contract prohibited Fawcett from publishing their own paperback reprints.

Roscoe Kent Fawcett wanted to establish a line of Fawcett paperbacks, and he felt original paperbacks would not be a violation of the contract. In order to test a loophole in the contract, Fawcett published two anthologies — The Best of True Magazine and What Today's Woman Should Know About Marriage and Sex — reprinting material from Fawcett magazines not previously published in books. When these books successfully sailed through the contract loophole, Fawcett announced Gold Medal Books, their line of paperback originals. Sales soared, prompting Ralph Daigh to comment, "In the past six months we have produced 9,020,645 books, and people seem to like them very well." However, hardcover publishers resented Roscoe Fawcett's innovation, as evidenced by Doubleday's LeBaron R. Barker, who claimed that paperback originals could "undermine the whole structure of publishing."

It was a revolutionary turning point in paperback publishing. William Lengel was the Gold Medal editor, and the art director was Al Allard, who had been employed with Fawcett since 1928.

Beginning their numbering system at 101, Gold Medal got underway with Alan Hynd's We Are the Public Enemies, the anthology Man Story and The Persian Cat by John Flagg. Writing about the demise of pulp magazines in The Dime Detectives, Ron Goulart observed, "Fawcett dealt another blow to the pulps when, in 1950, it introduced its Gold Medal line. What Gold Medal specialized in was original novels. Some were merely sleazy, but others were in a tough, hard-boiled style that seemed somehow more knowing and more contemporary than that of the surviving pulps." Early Gold Medal authors included John D. MacDonald, Charles Williams, Richard S. Prather, and Marijane Meaker (under the pseudonym of "Vin Packer").

Other 1950 Gold Medal originals included the Western Stretch Dawson by William R. Burnett, the first lesbian pulp novel Women's Barracks by Tereska Torrès (later to be followed by Marijane Meaker's Spring Fire and Ann Bannon's Beebo Brinker Chronicles) and mystery-adventure novels — Nude in Mink by Sax Rohmer and I'll Find You by Richard Himmel. After Donald E. Keyhoe's article "Flying Saucers Are Real" in True (January 1950) created a sold-out sensation, with True going back to press for another print run, Keyhoe expanded the article into a top-selling paperback, The Flying Saucers Are Real, published by Fawcett that same year.

With an increase from 35 titles in 1950 to 66 titles in 1951, Gold Medal's obvious success in issuing paperback originals revolutionized the industry. While MacDonald, Williams, Prather, Louis L'Amour, Richard Matheson, Bruno Fischer, and MacKinlay Kantor were joining Gold Medal's roster of writers, other paperback publishers were soon asking agents for original manuscripts. Literary agent Donald MacCampbell stated that one publisher "threatened to boycott my agency if it continued to negotiate contracts with original 25-cent firms."

References

1950 establishments in New York City
American companies established in 1950
Book publishing companies based in New York City
Publishing companies established in 1950
Fawcett Publications